Harpalus fulvicornis is a species of ground beetle in the subfamily Harpalinae. It was described by Thunberg in 1806.

References

fulvicornis
Beetles described in 1806